InVision Technologies, Inc. was a publicly traded company based in Newark, California, that manufactured and sold airport security screening devices to detect explosives in passenger baggage.  One of its most well-known products is the CTX explosive-detection device. One of its founding members was Sauveur Chemouni.

FCPA case

The company was notable, in part, because its case was the first time the US Department of Justice had resolved a Foreign Corrupt Practices Act (FCPA) case through a non-prosecution agreement.

The charges were based upon conduct of the company's third party distributors (but not the company itself), while InVision's staff failed to timely investigate certain "red flag" emails copied to their addresses. The company voluntarily disclosed its findings resulting from internal investigations related to the issues which arose during the preparation for the acquisition of InVision by General Electric Company.

The NPA, concluded in December 2004, required from the company, in part, a $800,000 penalty and a requirement to improve the enforcement of FCPA compliance.

On July 1, 2009, the European Union approved GE Security's sale of 81 percent of the previous InVision business division to French company Safran.

References

External links
 GE Security - Aviation
 SEC info about settlement

Safran Group
Companies based in Newark, California
Technology companies based in the San Francisco Bay Area
Defunct companies based in the San Francisco Bay Area